Gamal El-Din El-Sherbini (10 August 1923 – November 1995) was an Egyptian athlete. He competed in the men's pole vault at the 1952 Summer Olympics.

References

External links
 

1923 births
1995 deaths
Athletes (track and field) at the 1952 Summer Olympics
Egyptian male pole vaulters
Olympic athletes of Egypt